Vladimir Ivanovich Begma (born 3 January 1941) is a Russian contemporary artist who works primarily in painting and illustrating. .

Biography 

Born in Lvovka, Kalachinsky District, Omsk Oblast. Then he studied at Moscow Polygraphic Institute on Print Art Design faculty and graduated in 1969. He was apprentice of A. Goncharov and V. Lyakhov (famous Soviet People Artists). In 1975 he became a member of USSR Union of Artists (now ).

Vladimir Begma worked more than fifty years in visual arts and thirty-five years in pedagogy at Art Schools in Rostov. He was mentor of S. Gavrilyachenko (People Visual artist of Russian Federation), N. Polyushenko (Honored artist of Russian Federation),  and some other famous Russian artists. His works was crucial to autolithography and animalistic art.

Art works

Recognition 

Awarded by Silver medal of Russian Academy of Arts (2008), diplomas of USSR Union of Artists and Russian Union of Artists (1980, 1985, 1987, 1999, 2004 and 2008) and other awards. In 2010 he was awarded by title of «Honored artist of Russian Federation».

References 

Notes

Bibliography (in Russian)

External links 
 Новый взгляд на «Тихий Дон» в работах художника Владимира Бегмы — статья
 О работах художника, посвященных Шолоховской теме
 О персональной выставке художника «Сказки русского леса» в Липецком областном художественном музее
 О персональной выставке 12 января 2006 г. в Ростовском областном музее краеведения
 О выставке «Под Донским небом» 5 июня 2004 г. в выставочном зале «Меценат» г. Азова
 Ростовские художники Бегма стали лауреатами премии «Семья России» в номинации «Династия»
 Лошади в живописи и графике Владимира Бегмы
 Детям о творчестве художника
 О персональной выставке
 О персональной выставке, приуроченной к 70-летию художника
 Сюжет на телеканале Дон-ТР о юбилейной персональной выставке
 «Афиша Ростова» — заметка о юбилейной персональной выставке
 Сюжет на телеканале Дон-ТР о выставке работ художников-ветеранов
 Сюжет на телеканале Дон-ТР о выставке в Краеведческом музее Ростова-на-Дону

1941 births
Living people
Russian contemporary artists
Russian painters
Russian male painters